The Flood Control Act of 1965, Title II of , was enacted on October 27, 1965, by the 89th Congress and authorized the United States Army Corps of Engineers to design and construct numerous flood control projects including the Lake Pontchartrain and Vicinity, Louisiana Hurricane Protection Project in the New Orleans region of south Louisiana.

Basic provisions
Sec 201 of the Act authorized the Secretary of the Army, acting through the Chief of Engineers (of the U.S. Army Corps of Engineers) to design and construct any water resource development project, including navigation, flood control, and shore protection if the cost of any single project did not exceed $10 million.  Any such project was subject to local cost sharing in the same manner as larger projects.

Surveys
Sec 208 of the Act authorized the Corps of Engineers to conduct surveys for flood control and allied purposes, to include drainage and channel improvements.

Impact on New Orleans
The pre-Katrina Orleans Levee District (OLD), governed by the Orleans Levee Board (OLB), owned considerable assets, mainly real estate, a peculiarity that stems from its history. In the early twentieth century, the OLD reclaimed a portion of Lake Pontchartrain, a 24-mile wide lake north of New Orleans. The OLD developed the land and sold it to raise money to build and improve levees. The Lake Vista, Lake Oaks, Lake Terrace, East and West Lakeshore subdivisions and other property between Robert E. Lee Blvd and Lake Pontchartrain are all examples of these developed properties. The OLD also owned a marina and a small commercial airport on a man-made peninsula created from dredged material in the early 1930s.
 
In the Flood Control Act of 1965––legislation enacted in response to losses exceeding $1 billion (including multiple levee failures) during Hurricane Betsy––Congress directed the Corps, from then forward, to be responsible for design and construction of the hurricane flood protection system enveloping New Orleans. The Corps was ordered to work in consultation with the OLD which became the local sponsor for the Lake Pontchartrain and Vicinity Hurricane Protection Project.

Congress directed the corps build a flood protection system to protect south Louisiana from the worst storms characteristic of the region. The corps began developing the storm model in 1959, called the Standard Project Hurricane (SPH).  This model was not subsequently adjusted, despite the National Oceanic and Atmospheric Administration (the successor agency to the Weather Bureau) recommending increasing the strength of the model: the Corps did not change its construction plans. The local levee boards retained the role of maintenance once the projects were complete. When authorized, this mandate was projected to take 13 years to complete.  When Katrina struck in 2005, the project was between 60-90% complete and the projected date of completion was estimated to be 2015.

Details of the congressional mandate are defined in the Government Accountability Office's testimony before the Senate Committee on Environment and Public Works on September 28, 2005.  The opening paragraph of the twelve page report reads:

''"Congress first authorized the Lake Pontchartrain and Vicinity, Louisiana Hurricane Protection Project in the Flood Control Act of 1965.  The project was to construct a series of control structures, concrete floodwalls, and levees to provide hurricane protection to areas around Lake Pontchartrain.  The project, when designed, was expected to take about 13 years to complete and cost about $85 million.  Although federally authorized, it was a joint federal, state, and local effort."

In 2005, the estimated cost of construction for the completed project is $738 million with the federal share being $528 million and the local share $210 million. The initial scope of the project was to provide hurricane protection to areas around the lake in the parishes of Orleans, Jefferson, St. Bernard, and St. Charles with the federal government paying 70 percent of the costs and the state and local interests paying 30 percent, the typical cost-share arrangement.

Specific projects
Sec 204 of the Act authorized projects in the following locations:
 St John River Basin, Maine
 Housatonic River Basin, Connecticut
 New England - Atlantic Coastal Area
 Long Island Sound
 New York - Atlantic Coastal Area
 Elizabeth River Basin, New Jersey
 Rahway River Basin, New Jersey
 Neuse River Basin, North Carolina
 Middle Atlantic Coastal Area
 Flint River Basin, Georgia
 Central and Southern Florida Basin
 South Atlantic Coastal Area
 Phillippi Creek Basin, Florida
 Lower Mississippi River Basin, adapting the Birds Point - New Madrid project enacted by 45 Stat. 34 at an estimated cost of $189,109,000
 General Projects - Grand Isle, Morgan City, and Lake Pontchartrain, Louisiana (Lake Pontchartrain at a cost of $56,235,000)
 Ouachita River Basin, Louisiana
 Red River Basin, Arkansas, Louisiana, and Texas
 Gulf of Mexico - various bayous in Texas 
 Rio Grande Basin, Texas at a cost of $12,493,000
 Arkansas River Basin, as authorized by the Rivers and Harbors Act of 1946 - various creeks and rivers in Colorado, Arkansas, Oklahoma, and Kansas
 Missouri River Basin - various creeks and rivers in Kansas, Iowa, South Dakota, North Dakota, Missouri, and Montana
 Ohio River Basin - various creeks and rivers in Ohio, Pennsylvania, Indiana, Illinois, Kentucky, Virginia, West Virginia
 Red River of the North Basin
 Upper Mississippi River Basin - various projects in Iowa, Illinois, Missouri, Minnesota and South Dakota
 Great Lakes Basin
 Little Colorado River Basin
 Gila River Basin, Arizona
 Eel River, Whitewater River, Santa Ana River, Sacramento River, San Diego River Basins, California
 San Francisco Bay Area
 Columbia River Basin, Oregon and Washington

San Francisco Bay water quality
Sec 216 of the Act authorized the Corps of Engineers to study the water and wastewater quality of various bodies of water in the San Francisco Bay area.

Modification of other Flood Control Acts
 Flood Control Act of 1944, with respect to roads impacted by Whitney Dam, Texas
 Flood Control Act of 1958, with respect to the Minnesota River
 Flood Control Act of 1960, with respect to funding limitations
 Flood Control Act of 1962, with respect to the Scioto River, Ohio

See also
2005 levee failures in Greater New Orleans
IHNC Lake Borgne Surge Barrier
Rivers and Harbors Act for related legislation which sometime also implement flood control provisions. 
Standard Project Hurricane
Water Resources Development Act

References

External links
Levees.Org (non-profit flood protection group in New Orleans)

1965 in the environment
1965 in law
1965